Maurus of Parentium is the patron saint of the Croatian city of Poreč, called Parentium in Roman times. The Catholic Church has had a presence in Istria since the times of the early Christian martyrs. Maurus (sv. Mavro) was the first bishop of Poreč and the Istrian diocese who suffered a martyred death in the late 3rd century. A basilica was built in Poreč in the 5th century called Euphrasian Basilica where the relics of Saint Maurus, now the patron saint of the city, are kept in the votive chapel called a martyrium. He is shown on the mosaic of the basilica with a martyr's crown in his hand.

3rd-century deaths
3rd-century bishops in Roman Dalmatia
3rd-century Christian martyrs
Year of birth unknown
People from Poreč